Big Apple Blizzard Blast was a professional wrestling live event produced by Extreme Championship Wrestling (ECW) on February 3, 1996. The event was held in the Lost Battalion Hall in Queens, New York City, New York in the United States. 

Excerpts from Big Apple Blizzard Blast aired on episodes #146 and #147 of the syndicated television show ECW Hardcore TV, while the event was released on VHS in 1996. It was made available for streaming on the WWE Network in 2020. Excerpts from the event also featured on A Current Affair, which had a film crew at ringside. The bout between Juventud Guerrera and Rey Misterio Jr. also appeared on the 2007 DVD Rey Mysterio – The Biggest Little Man.

Event 
The commentator for Big Apple Blizzard Blast was Joey Styles. The ring announcer was Joel Gertner.

In the opening bout, Taz defeated The Shark Attack Kid in a squash using the Tazmission. Following the match, Taz challenged 911 to come to the ring. ECW commissioner Tod Gordon came out instead of 911, resulting in a brawl between Gordon and Taz's manager Bill Alfonso. After Taz attacked Gordon, Bam Bam Bigelow made his surprise debut, chasing away Taz and Alfonso.

The second bout was a tag team match between the Headhunters and Axl Rotten and El Puerto Riqueño. The match ended when one of the Headhunters pinned El Puerto Ricano following a moonsault.

The third bout saw ECW World Tag Team Champions Cactus Jack and Mikey Whipwreck defend their titles against the Eliminators. The match was marked by dissension between Cactus Jack and Whipwreck, with Cactus Jack - who had signed with the World Wrestling Federation and was facetiously championing hardcore wrestling - repeatedly hindering Whipwreck, including blocking him from applying holds. Whipwreck in turn prevented Cactus Jack from using a broken bottle as a weapon. The match ended when Cactus Jack distracted Whipwreck, enabling the Eliminators to perform Total Elimination on him and pin him. After the match, Cactus Jack turned on Whipwreck, giving him a double arm DDT onto a steel chair.

Following the match, Francine came to the ring and offered to become the manager of the Eliminators. This was revealed to be a trick, with Francine's clients the Pitbulls attacking the Eliminators, delivering a superbomb to Kronus and choking Saturn with a chain before Francine cut his hair off.

The fourth bout was another tag team match pitting Raven (the then-ECW World Heavyweight Champion) and Stevie Richards against Shane Douglas and Tommy Dreamer in a continuation of the long-running feud between Raven and Dreamer. The match ended when Dreamer's valet Beulah McGillicutty tied a frying pan to his boot and he delivered an enzuigiri to Richards, then pinned him.

The fifth bout saw WWA World Welterweight Champion Rey Misterio Jr. defend his title against the debuting Juventud Guerrera (substituting for Psicosis, who had missed the show). Misterio won a fast-paced lucha libre bout by pinfall after reversing a sitout crucifix powerbomb into a hurricanrana. Following the match, Taz and Bill Alfonso came to the ring, resulting in a confrontation with Misterio that ended with Taz German suplexing Misterio. J.T. Smith then attacked Misterio until being attacked himself by Hack Meyers.

Woman - the Manager of 2 Cold Scorpio and the Sandman - then came to the ring. Woman, who had signed a contract with rival promotion World Championship Wrestling and had already appeared on WCW Monday Nitro, acknowledged that she was joining WCW and tried to convince announcer Joey Styles and ECW mainstay the Sandman to come to WCW with her. After both men declined, Woman refused to leave the building. 2 Cold Scorpio then came to the ring and carried Woman out of the building, depositing her in a limousine and instructing the chauffeur to "take that bitch to Atlanta!" (the headquarters of WCW). 

After Woman had left, the Blue Meanie and Stevie Richards came to the ring to try and convince the Sandman to withdraw from his scheduled match against ECW World Heavyweight Champion Raven at Cyberslam. The Sandman refused and knocked the Blue Meanie unconscious using his Singapore cane, drawing out Raven himself. Stevie Richards then announced that he was suing Missy Hyatt - who had kissed him at Holiday Hell - for sexual harassment (an in-joke referring to Hyatt's legitimate lawsuit against her former employer World Championship Wrestling for sexual harassment). Raven then invited Hyatt to join Raven's Nest, but she refused and instead agreed to become the Sandman's manager.

The sixth bout, which was not included on the VHS, was a tag team match between the Headhunters and the Pitbulls which was won by the Pitbulls.

The seventh bout was a singles match between Chris Jericho and Rob Van Dam. Jericho won the bout by pinfall using a Lionsault. This was Jericho's second match with ECW, and was scheduled to be his first televised match. In what Jericho described as the "Jericho Curse", the match went poorly, with ECW promoter Paul Heyman telling Jericho that the recording of the match was defective as an excuse for not airing it. In 2018, WWE - which acquired the footage following the closure of ECW - added the match to the WWE Network. 

The eighth bout was a singles match between Buh Buh Ray Dudley and J.T. Smith. Dudley won the bout in under one minute, pinning Smith following a powerbomb.

The penultimate match was a singles bout between Mr. Hughes and Sabu. Sabu won the match by pinfall following a spinning heel kick using a chair.

The main event of Big Apple Blizzard Blast was a tag team match between The Gangstas and 2 Cold Scorpio and the Sandman. The match ended when 2 Cold Scorpio pinned Mustafa using a roll-up after spraying hair spray in his eyes.

Results

References 

1996 in New York City
1996 in professional wrestling
1990s in Queens
Extreme Championship Wrestling supercards and pay-per-view events
Events in New York City
February 1996 events in the United States
Professional wrestling in New York City